Alexander James Auld (born January 7, 1981) is a Canadian former professional ice hockey goaltender. Auld played in the National Hockey League (NHL) with the Vancouver Canucks, Florida Panthers, Phoenix Coyotes, Boston Bruins, Ottawa Senators, Dallas Stars, New York Rangers and the Montreal Canadiens. He has also appeared internationally for Team Canada on three occasions: the 2001 World Junior Championships, the 2004 Spengler Cup, and the 2006 World Championships.

Playing career

Minor
Auld played most of his minor hockey in his hometown of Thunder Bay, Ontario, with the Thunder Bay Kings program. He was a minor hockey teammate of future NHLers Taylor Pyatt, Patrick Sharp, Jason Jaspers and Aaron MacKenzie. Their Kings team won Gold in the All Ontario Bantam AAA championships in 1997 played in North Bay, Ontario.

Junior
Auld started junior career with the North Bay Centennials of the Ontario Hockey League (OHL) at the tail end of the 1997–98 season, appearing in six games without registering a win. After appearing in 38 games the following season, Auld was selected in the second round, 40th overall, of the 1999 NHL Entry Draft by the Florida Panthers. He would finish out his junior career with the Centennials, spending two more seasons as their starting goaltender. In his final season, Auld was named to Team Canada for the 2001 World Junior Ice Hockey Championships, where he backed up Maxime Ouellet. Later that same season, Auld was traded to the Vancouver Canucks for a third round pick in the 2002 NHL Entry Draft and a compensatory pick in the 2001 NHL Entry Draft.

Professional

Auld turned professional in the 2001–02 season, joining the Canucks' American Hockey League (AHL) affiliate, the Manitoba Moose. An ankle sprain sidelined Auld during training camp, however, and upon his return, he was assigned to the Columbia Inferno of the East Coast Hockey League. Solid play in six games at that level returned Auld to the AHL, where he showed steady improvement, despite competition for playing time from veterans Alfie Michaud and Martin Brochu. Following injuries to Canucks goaltenders Dan Cloutier and Peter Skudra, Auld earned a start at the NHL level, a 4–2 victory over the Dallas Stars on January 23, 2002, after which he returned to the AHL.

The 2002–03 season afforded Auld more opportunity for growth, although he again split playing time at the AHL level, this time with Tyler Moss. With Cloutier and Skudra entrenched at the NHL level, Auld still managed to appear in seven games as an injury replacement, and even played one Stanley Cup playoff game in relief. Most importantly, he received extensive playing time, and improved his statistics considerably.

During the off-season, backup Peter Skudra signed with a Russian team, raising the possibility that Auld might claim the backup role for the Canucks. As the 2003–04 season approached, however, Canucks general manager Brian Burke traded a draft pick to the Pittsburgh Penguins for Johan Hedberg, all but ensuring Auld another season in the minors. Again, Auld began the season sharing netminding duties with Tyler Moss. Auld again saw brief NHL action, appearing in six games. However, during the 2004 Stanley Cup playoffs, Dan Cloutier was injured early on in the Canucks' first round series with the Calgary Flames. Hedberg, who had been shaky as a backup, failed to impress head coach Marc Crawford in two appearances, and Auld claimed the starting role in Game 5, pushing Calgary the distance in the series, eventually losing in Game 7.

Auld spent the 2004–05 NHL lockout back with the Manitoba Moose in the AHL, this time pairing with veteran netminder Wade Flaherty. Despite holding on to the starting role for much of the season, Auld disappointed in the playoffs, and Flaherty took over as starter, helping the team reach the third round of the Calder Cup playoffs. He also appeared for Canada at the Spengler Cup in December 2004, carrying the team to a third-place finish.

Auld returned to the NHL when play resumed for the 2005–06 season, initially as the backup to Dan Cloutier. However, on November 20, 2005, Cloutier injured an anterior cruciate ligament (ACL) in a collision with Mighty Ducks of Anaheim forward Rob Niedermayer. The hope initially was that the injury would heal during the season, but on December 15, Cloutier opted for surgery, leaving Auld as Vancouver's starting goaltender. He would not play in another game for the Moose, leaving the AHL team as its franchise leader in wins and shutouts.

As the Canucks' starter, Auld was reunited with former World Junior teammate Maxime Ouellet, who was one of three goaltenders the Canucks used to back him up (Mika Noronen and Rob McVicar were the others). Filling in admirably, Auld went on to capture the Cyclone Taylor trophy as team MVP, although the Canucks would miss the playoffs. Auld then joined Team Canada again, this time at the 2006 World Championships, where Canada finished a disappointing fourth, losing the bronze medal game to Finland.

In June 2006, Auld was involved in a multi-player trade that sent him, Todd Bertuzzi and Bryan Allen to Florida in exchange for Roberto Luongo, Lukáš Krajíček and a sixth-round draft pick. Initially, Auld was expected to be the undisputed starter in Florida. However, the July 25 signing of Ed Belfour introduced some competition, and Belfour eventually won the job as starting goalie. Controversially, in October, Auld was hospitalized while "horsing around" with Belfour, with suspicions that Belfour had assaulted him.
 
After an unsuccessful season with Florida, Auld signed a one-year contract with the Phoenix Coyotes on August 13, 2007. However, on a team with already with a wealth of goaltenders — Auld would compete for a job with David Aebischer and Mikael Tellqvist at the beginning of the season — Phoenix would pick up Ilya Bryzgalov off waivers from the Anaheim Ducks, leaving Auld as one of the odd goaltenders out. After nine appearances with Phoenix, on December 6, 2007, Auld was traded to the Boston Bruins for right winger Nate DiCasmirro and the Bruins' fifth-round pick in 2009.

Playing backup to Tim Thomas for the majority of 2007–08, Auld would post the best statistics of his career (excluding his first few seasons with the Canucks, in which he appeared in no more than seven games in a season) with a personal-best two shutouts.

On July 1, 2008, Auld signed a two-year, $2 million deal with the Ottawa Senators as an unrestricted free agent. He came within one second of recording a shutout in his Senators debut against the Pittsburgh Penguins in Stockholm, Sweden, surrendering a powerplay goal in the final moments of the game. Though Senators' management expected him to serve primarily as a backup to Martin Gerber, Auld's strong play combined with Gerber's struggles resulted in Auld assuming the starting position early in the season. As the season progressed, Gerber was placed on waivers and ultimately was claimed by the Toronto Maple Leafs, while rookie Brian Elliott would split the goaltending duties with Auld in Ottawa. He was expected to challenge for the starting position in 2009–10 with Pascal Leclaire, acquired by Ottawa from the Columbus Blue Jackets late at the 2008–09 trade deadline, but was traded in the off-season on July 8, 2009, to the Dallas Stars in exchange for a sixth-round draft pick in 2010.

On February 27, 2010, Auld was claimed off re-entry waivers by the New York Rangers. On July 1, 2010, he signed a one-year, $1 million contract with the Montreal Canadiens.

On July 1, 2011, Auld re-joined the Ottawa Senators, signing a one-year, $1 million contract.

On July 23, 2012, Auld left the NHL and signed as a free agent with Austrian club Red Bull Salzburg of the Austrian Hockey League (EBEL). He would retire after playing one season.

International play
Auld first played for Team Canada at the junior level in the 2001 World Junior Championships helping claim the bronze medal. He made a senior competitive debut with Team Canada at the Swiss-based 2004 Spengler Cup, finishing in 3rd place.

He made his full IIHF debut for Canada at the 2006 World Championships, losing the bronze medal game to place fourth.

Personal life
Auld was born in Cold Lake, Alberta, when his father was stationed out of CFB Cold Lake; however, he spent the majority of his adolescence in Thunder Bay, Ontario.

Auld's wife is celebrity handbag and jewellery designer Melanie Auld. The couple have two children together. The couple splits their time between Vancouver and Thunder Bay.

NHL milestones
1st NHL Game: January 23, 2002 vs Dallas Stars Canucks 4 Stars 2 
1st NHL Win: January 23, 2002 vs Dallas Stars Canucks 4 Stars 2 
1st NHL Shutout: March 23, 2003 vs Washington Capitals Canucks 6 Capitals 0  his 6th career game

On March 9, 2008, Auld, as a member of the Boston Bruins, allowed no goals in regulation time or overtime to the New York Rangers, but his team lost 1–0 in a shootout.  According to NHL rules, the Bruins (as a team) and Auld (individually) received credit for a shutout.  Auld thus became the first Boston Bruin goaltender to record a shutout in a game which his team lost.

Career statistics

Awards and honours
OHL Second All-Rookie Team - 1999
OHL Third All-Star Team - 2001
Cyclone Taylor Trophy (Vancouver Canucks MVP) - 2006
Molson Cup (Vancouver Canucks three-star selection leader) - 2006

References

External links 

Auld's biography at Hockeygoalies.org

1981 births
Boston Bruins players
Canadian ice hockey goaltenders
Columbia Inferno players
Dallas Stars players
EC Red Bull Salzburg players
Florida Panthers draft picks
Florida Panthers players
Ice hockey people from Alberta
Ice hockey people from Ontario
Sportspeople from Thunder Bay
Living people
Manitoba Moose players
Montreal Canadiens players
North Bay Centennials players
Ottawa Senators players
People from Cold Lake, Alberta
Phoenix Coyotes players
San Antonio Rampage players
Vancouver Canucks players
Canadian expatriate ice hockey players in Austria